SS California was one of the first steamships to steam in the Pacific Ocean and the first steamship to travel from Central America to North America.  She was built for the Pacific Mail Steamship Company which was founded April 18, 1848 as a joint stock company in the State of New York by a group of New York City merchants: William H. Aspinwall, Edwin Bartlett, Henry Chauncey, Mr. Alsop, G.G. Howland and S.S. Howland. She was the first of three steamboats specified in a government mail contract to provide mail, passenger, and freight service from Panama to and from San Francisco and Oregon.

Background
In the first decades of the United States' existence, legislators generally did not believe the federal government had the power or authority to build roads, canals or other internal improvements, as the U.S. Constitution did not specify this as a legitimate federal role. Internal infrastructure improvements were thought to be the responsibility of private enterprise or the states. One way around this prohibition was to heavily subsidize mail contracts since this duty traditionally belonged to the federal government. Since about 89 percent of the federal government's income then was in the form of excise taxes on imports (also called custom duties or Ad Valorem taxes of about 25%) there was only a limited amount of money available.

Prior to 1848, Congress had already appropriated money to help subsidize mail steamers between Europe and the United States. A congressional mail contract from East Coast cities and New Orleans, Louisiana to and from the Chagres River in Panama was won by the U.S. Mail Steamship Company in about 1847. The often wildly variable Chagres was the Atlantic terminus of the trans-Isthmus trail across the Isthmus of Panama. In the rainy season (June–December) the trail often degenerated into a very muddy ordeal.

Contract and construction
The U.S. Mail Steamship Company, headed by George Law, dispatched their first paddle steamer, the SS Falcon, from New York City on December 1, 1848, just before the discovery of gold in California was confirmed by President James K. Polk in his State of the Union speech on December 5 and the display of about $3,000 in gold at the War Department. When the Falcon reached New Orleans, the company was swamped with passenger requests. The SS Falcon was joined by the steamships SS Crescent City, SS Orus and SS Isthmus as well as three overloaded sailing ships headed for the Isthmus of Panama.

The SS California was built as the first steamship specified in a mail contract of about $199,000 set up by Congress in 1847 to establish mail, passenger and freight service to the newly acquired territories of Oregon and California. These subsidies were for three steamships of about 1,000 tons to regularly (roughly every three weeks) steam from Oregon and California to and from Panama City, the Pacific terminus of the trans-Isthmus trail across the Isthmus of Panama. The contract for the ship was given to William H. Webb of New York City, a well-known builder of Clipper ships, in 1848.   The designs for oceangoing steamboats had already been worked out for regularly scheduled packet ships crossing the Atlantic Ocean between Le Havre, France, Liverpool, England and New York, Boston, and other U.S. cities. Steamship designs were advanced in the United States but temporarily ignored in some shipyards in favor of the new very fast Clipper ships.

She had two decks, three masts and a round stern, with a normal capacity of about 210 passengers. On January 4, 1848, Californias keel was laid down at New York, and launched May 19, 1848. She cost $200,082 to build.

California was built of choice oak and cedar, with her hull reinforced with diagonal iron straps to better withstand the pounding of her paddle wheels. Her hull was a modified version of the Clipper ship hulls then becoming popular. She was rigged with three masts and sails, and classed as a brigantine sailing ship. The wind was meant to be only an auxiliary or emergency source of power and she was expected to carry a head of steam at nearly all times while underway.  

California was powered by two 26-foot (7.9-m) diameter side paddle wheels driven by a large one-cylinder side-lever engine built by Novelty Iron Works of New York City. The engine turned the two side paddle wheels at about 13 revolutions per minute, driving the ship at about eight knots, with 14 knots possible under good conditions. She carried about 520 tons of coal.

How it works

A side-lever engine was a rugged and fairly easy-to-build but inefficient single-stage design for early marine steam engines, eventually replaced in ocean use with better and more efficient multiple-stage engines. Where fuel was cheap and easily obtainable, as on American rivers, the similar walking beam engine was used well into the 1890s. One of the main disadvantages of the side-lever steam engine was that it put a lot of weight high in the ship, making the ship more susceptible to capsizing in rough weather and vulnerable to naval gunfire from a warship. Like all engines, the side-lever engine required lubrication. Piston-cylinder lubrication was provided by allowing the steam to pick up a small amount of oil before being injected into the cylinder. Some type of oil cups were used on all the other moving parts. The lubricant used then was a form of whale oil, the main lubricant of the period. The maintenance schedule is unknown. She was driven by about 10 psi steam generated by two return-flue boilers that used salt water for steam and coal as her fuel.  Since steamships required from 2 to 10 tons of coal per day, they were more expensive to run and had a maximum range of about  before needing re-fueling.  The coal was fed to Californias boilers by twelve firemen shoveling by hand around the clock.

A regular sailing ship typically made 4-5 knots and a Clipper ship averaged about 6-7 knots. Clipper ships under optimum sailing conditions could make 15-20 knots. A Clipper ship named Champion of the Seas traveled a record 465 nautical miles in 24 hours and the Flying Cloud set the world's sailing record for the fastest passage between New York City and San Francisco around Cape Horn - 89 days, 8 hours. She held this record for over 130 years, from 1854 to 1989.

California left New York City on October 6, 1848 with only a partial load of her about 60 saloon (about $300 fare) and 150 steerage (about $150 fare) passenger capacity. Only a few were going all the way to California. Her crew numbered about 36 men. She left New York well before definite word of the California Gold Rush had reached the East Coast. She made it to Rio de Janeiro in a record time of 24 days from New York. There she stopped for engine repairs and to resupply coal, fresh water, wood, fresh fruits and vegetables and other supplies.  After traversing the Straits of Magellan she stopped at Valparaíso, Chile; Callao, Peru (just outside Lima); and Paita, Peru for more supplies.  The coal supplies had been previously shipped to the various ports by sailing ships that had left earlier.

Gold Rush period

As word of the California Gold Rush spread, she started picking up more passengers wanting to go to California. At Valparaíso she filled most of her remaining berths. When news reached the East Coast about the gold rush and the estimated time of Californias arrival at Panama City, there was a rush to get to Panama to catch her before she continued the journey up the Pacific coast. When California arrived at Panama City on January 17, 1849, there were many more passengers than there was room. Provisions were made for extra passengers that were selected by lottery and paid $200 per ticket; some sold their tickets for much more. The SS California eventually proceeded towards San Francisco with about 400 passengers and a crew of 36; many more passengers were left behind to find their way later on other ships.

On the way to San Francisco, low coal supplies required her to put into San Diego and Monterey, California to get wood to feed her boilers - engines then were simple enough to burn either coal or wood. Any "extra" wood on board was also fed to the boilers. The combination of a larger load and the southbound California Current required more coal than she had picked up in Panama. As the first steamship on the Panama-to-San Francisco route she had no prior experience or fuel consumption information to follow.

Shortly after arriving in San Francisco, nearly all of her crew jumped ship and deserted. It took Captain Cleveland Forbes two months to rehire a new crew and get more coal and steam back to Panama. California left San Francisco on May 1, 1849 with the California mail, passengers and high-value cargo, as specified in the congressional mail contract, and reached Panama City on May 23, 1849. The new crew was much more expensive but the Panama City–San Francisco route was so potentially lucrative that the costs were simply deferred to the passengers in the price of a ticket. The mail, passengers and priority cargo to and from California soon developed into a paying proposition as more and more mail, cargo and passengers flowed to and from California. Much of the gold found in California was shipped back east by Panama Steamer. Businesses of all kinds needed new goods which were generally only available in the east. By the end of May 1849, 59 vessels, including 17 steamers, had disgorged about 4,000 passengers in San Francisco.

As some of the early miners started returning to San Francisco with gold they had found, many bought tickets to return to the East Coast via Panama (the fastest and most popular return route) and there was soon a lucrative scheduled steamship route running to and from Panama City. Most of the gold found in California was eventually exported back to the East Coast via the Panama route. Well-guarded gold shipments regularly went to Panama, took a well-escorted mule and canoe trip to the mouth of the Chagres River, and then caught another steamship to the East Coast, usually New York City. As the Panama Railroad was being constructed, passengers, gold shipments, mail, etc. took advantage of its track as it crawled across Panama. These shipments and passengers helped pay for its construction and after it was built made its  of track some of the most lucrative in the world.

The first three steamships constructed for service in the Pacific were California (1848),  (1848) and SS Panama (1848). Oregon was launched on August 5, 1848 by Smith & Dimon of New York and sailed from New York for San Francisco on December 8, 1848, calling at Panama City and arriving at San Francisco on April 1, 1849. The Oregon was used regularly on the Panama City-San Francisco route until 1855. The Panama was launched on July 29, 1848. She sailed from New York on February 15, 1849 and arrived in San Francisco on June 4. The trip from Panama City to San Francisco normally took about 17 days, and slightly less time to travel from San Francisco to Panama City. As more steamers became available, a regular schedule for mail, passengers and cargo was a trip about every ten days to and from Panama City.

As the gold rush continued, the very lucrative San Francisco to Panama City route soon needed more and larger paddle steamers; ten more were eventually put into service. California was soon dwarfed by much larger ships built to carry more passengers and freight. She operated regularly between San Francisco and Panama from 1849 to 1854, then was put to use as a spare steamer in 1856. In 1875 she was converted into a sailing ship and her engine removed. Rigged as a bark, she was engaged in hauling coal-and-lumber until she wrecked near Pacasmayo Province, Peru in 1895.

Panama Railroad
In 1851, William H. Aspinwall and associates began construction on the Panama Railroad across Panama. This route started in a town called Aspinwall (now called Colon) at its Atlantic terminus. The Pacific terminus was Panama City, and tracks were laid in both directions until they met at the Culebra summit. The tracks met in January 1855, after a cost of about 5,000 lives and $8 million. This railroad made the sea routes via Panama very attractive, faster and reliable to travelers going to or from California even before it was completed in 1855. A trip that had taken 7-10 difficult and uncomfortable days was converted into a one-day train ride. After 1855 a trip from the East Coast to California could be reliably predicted to take about 40 days or less going either way. After 1855, the Panama route and the easy one-day passage across Panama essentially shut down competing routes to California across Nicaragua and Mexico. Most of the returning miners (it is estimated that about 20% of "Argonauts" returned east) and their gold took the Panama route.

Ship log

The log of the SS California was originally published in the New Orleans Daily Picayune (February 23, 1849 Evening Edition). All dates are given in sea time.  Navigators begin their day at noon, because that's when their latitude is normally determined by observation of the sun, while the longitude is also normally determined during the daytime by referencing a chronometer and an astronomical almanac. The navigator's count of days is one day in advance of that of the astronomer's (and civilian's) calendar.

‡‡ The trip from New York City to Rio de Janeiro took 24 days and broke existing records. The long stay at Rio is attributed to making necessary repairs to the engine, as well as a sick Captain.

Sunk

The SS California wrecked and sank in the Pacific Ocean near Pacasmayo Province, Peru in 1895.  There were no deaths.  At the time, she had been reconstructed as a bark and engaged in hauling coal and lumber.  On her last run, she had left  Port Hadlock in  Washington state with a cargo of lumber valued at $3,000.

References

External links
SS California writeup  Accessed 11 Apr 2011

Steamships of the United States
California Gold Rush
History of Colombia
1848 ships
SS